Yang Hak-seon (born 6 December 1992) is a South Korean artistic gymnast who specialises in the vault. He is the first South Korean gymnast to win an Olympic gold medal.

Personal life
According to his Olympic profile, Yang started his gymnastics career at the age of 9, following his brother's footsteps.

Yang is currently attending the Korea National Sport University.

Yang's parents are Yang Gwan-gwon and Ki Suk-hyang. Their impoverished family previously lived in one of Gwangju's shantytowns, before relocating to North Jeolla Province's Gochang, in South Korea's countryside, in 2010, after his father, a construction worker, suffered from serious injuries. His family currently lives in a makeshift converted greenhouse constructed from PVC pipes. After Yang's father lost his job, Yang supported the family with a modest income from the Korea Gymnastic Association. Yang's coach Cho Sung-doe admitted that he had been unaware of the family's precarious financial situation before Yang won the gold medal.

Yang also competed on the Korean survivor game show Physical: 100 by Netflix in 2023.

Career 
Yang placed fourth and just missed medaling in the individual vault final at the 2010 Artistic Gymnastics World Championships in Rotterdam, The Netherlands, and would later become vault champion at the 2010 Asian Games and then 2011 Artistic Gymnastics World Championships in Tokyo, Japan. In 2012, he became the first Korean gymnast to win Olympic gold in gymnastics, winning the vault competition in London. In 2013, he went on to win gold in vault at the 2013 Summer Universiade in Kazan, Russia. He is famous in the gymnastics world for performing one of the five hardest vaults in the world, the Yang Hak Seon, which is a front handspring on and into three twists off in a layout position. It was unveiled in the individual vault final at the 2011 Artistic Gymnastics World Championships, and initially carried the highest ever difficulty score (D-score) of 7.4 in men's vault at the time under the 2009-2012 Code of Points (CoP). The difficulty value of the Yang Hak Seon has been adjusted at the beginning of subsequent quads since, initially down to 6.4 under the 2012-2016 CoP and now further to 6.0 under the current 2017-2020 CoP. The International Gymnastics Federation (FIG) regularly reassesses and adjusts D-scores (typically down) due to the steady advancement of general skill levels over time in gymnastics, especially on vault because of its D-scores being assigned numeric values instead of letter representations like with all other apparatuses—vault is the only apparatus in gymnastics to have that simply due to the nature of the apparatus. Yang is also said to be working on a difficult second vault but with a sideways entry.

Yang was a reigning world champion, having won gold in vault at both the 2011 Worlds and 2013 Artistic Gymnastics World Championships in Tokyo and Antwerp respectively. However, at the 2014 Artistic Gymnastics World Championships in Nanning, China, he fell on both of his vaults—the first for which it was announced in Nanning that he was widely expected but failed to received naming credit for a brand new top then 6.4 difficulty vault, initially dubbed the Yang Hak Seon 2, or a straight Tsukahara with 3½ twist—failing to defend his title and finished in seventh place with a final average combined score of 14.416 after qualifying in first place. Yang had earlier submitted to possibly attempt this new vault at the 2013 Worlds as well but chose not to compete it in any stage of the individual vault apparatus event. Ri Se Gwang of North Korea won the gold medal with two top then 6.4 difficulty vaults that were both named after him, the Ri Se Gwang (full-twisting double Tsukahara) and Ri Se Gwang 2 (double front piked with ½ twist), and outscored Yang by exactly one full point (15.416). He was similarly unable to defend his Olympic title at the 2016 Summer Olympics in Rio de Janeiro due to injury. At the 2017 Artistic Gymnastics World Championships in Montreal, Canada, Yang had "qualified" (Q) in first place for the vault event final but pulled out after that because he had sustained a hamstring injury during qualifications. 

At the 2019 Artistic Gymnastics World Championships in Stuttgart, Germany, Yang had qualified for the individual vault event final in first place, but finished eighth after falling out of the first vault—his own the Yang Hak Seon on vault, or front handspring (layout) triple twist—as well as incurring a 0.300 penalty for stepping out-of-bounds because of that.

Yang's training and preparation for the 2020 Summer Olympics in Tokyo, Japan, were adjusted for his performance to peak accordingly for one year due to 2019–20 COVID-19 pandemic. At the Olympics, he failed to qualify automatically for the individual event finals on vault after placing ninth in qualifying due to the poor execution and penalty point received in his second vault. He became the first reserve for the finals but ending up not competing.

In the 2021 Artistic Gymnastics World Championships in Kitakyushu, Japan, Yang qualified for the individual vault apparatus finals in a tie for the highest average combined score of 14.833 with but ranked second to Nazar Chepurnyi of Ukraine after the tie-breaking procedure was applied. However, Yang completed the event in fifth place after some weak execution on his second vault once again.

Competitive history

Eponymous skills

References

External links
 
 Yang Hak-Seon (vault)

Living people
1992 births
South Korean male artistic gymnasts
Olympic gymnasts of South Korea
Gymnasts at the 2012 Summer Olympics
Olympic gold medalists for South Korea
Medalists at the World Artistic Gymnastics Championships
Olympic medalists in gymnastics
Sasuke (TV series) contestants
Medalists at the 2012 Summer Olympics
Asian Games medalists in gymnastics
Gymnasts at the 2010 Asian Games
Gymnasts at the 2014 Asian Games
Asian Games gold medalists for South Korea
Asian Games silver medalists for South Korea
Asian Games bronze medalists for South Korea
Medalists at the 2010 Asian Games
Medalists at the 2014 Asian Games
Universiade medalists in gymnastics
Universiade gold medalists for South Korea
Universiade silver medalists for South Korea
South Korean Buddhists
Competitors at the 2013 Summer Universiade
Medalists at the 2015 Summer Universiade
Originators of elements in artistic gymnastics
Gymnasts at the 2020 Summer Olympics
Sportspeople from Gwangju
21st-century South Korean people